The term "toaster" refers to a self-contained software package (or "appliance") that is easily distributable by electronic means, such as the Freedom Toaster project,  This use generally connotes free software and is a term occasionally used in the open source software community."

A toaster appliance is often made up of software components that were not originally packaged together. The new toaster package provides a co-ordinated packaging framework in which all the components can function together as a self-contained unit.

References

Free software
Computing terminology